Splatter Farm is a 1987 horror film directed by the Polonia Brothers and starring them along with Todd Smith.

Plot
Twin brothers Alan and Joseph spend the summer visiting their Aunt Lacey at her secluded, run-down property, not knowing that she has a necrophilic attraction to her deceased husband, whose body she keeps in her house, and that her farmhand Jeremy dismembers local townsfolk and stores their body parts in the barn for uses later on.

Production
Splatter Farm was part of the direct-to-video movement of the 1980s, which allowed film-makers with limited resources the ability to market their product.

Release
The film was released on VHS in 1987 by Donna Michele Productions, and again on DVD by Camp Motion Pictures, in 2007, in a somewhat modified format. A review on DVDTalk.com stated that the film had "an audacity that was startling in a film made by teenagers."

Sequel
The sequel Return to Splatter Farm was produced in Pennsylvania in 2019. It was directed by Mark Polonia and Jeff Kirkendall. The film was released on 11/10/2020. The story picks up 33 years after the events of the first film.

References

External links
 Mark Polonia on Twitter
 
  complete film on YouTube
 Return to Splatter Farm on IMDb

1987 horror films
Direct-to-video horror films
American splatter films
1987 direct-to-video films
1987 films
Films directed by Mark Polonia
Films set on farms
1980s English-language films
1980s American films